German immigration may refer to:

 Immigration to Germany
 Expulsion of Germans after World War II
 Emigration from Germany (disambiguation)
 German American
 German Australian
 German-Brazilian